The Welch OW-4 was a three seat, high-wing monoplane, designed by Orin Welch in the late 1920s.

Specifications
 Powerplant: 90 horsepower Curtiss OX-5 engine
 Seating capacity: 3 people (pilot, 2 passengers)

References 

1920s United States civil utility aircraft
High-wing aircraft
Aircraft first flown in 1929
Single-engined tractor aircraft